For the 1976 Vuelta a España, the field consisted of 100 riders; 49 finished the race.

By rider

By nationality

References

1976 Vuelta a España
1976